Asia (minor planet designation 67 Asia) is a large main belt asteroid. It was discovered by English astronomer N. R. Pogson on April 17, 1861, from the Madras Observatory. Pogson chose the name to refer both to Asia, a Titaness in Greek mythology, and to the continent of Asia, because the asteroid was the first to be discovered from that continent.

It has a 2:1 commensurability with Mars, having an orbital period double that of the planet. The orbital plane lies at an inclination of 6.0° to the plane of the ecliptic.

References

External links 
 
 

Background asteroids
Asia
Asia
S-type asteroids (Tholen)
S-type asteroids (SMASS)
18610417